was a Japanese samurai of the Sengoku period and the head of the Mori clan (Genji) family, who served the Saitō clan. The Saitō were the lords of Mino province. Later, he became a retainer of Oda Nobunaga.

Military life

In 1547, he fought at the Battle of Kanōguchi against the Oda clan under Saitō Dōsan.

In 1555, Yoshinari and his family became retainers of Oda Nobunaga. He defected towards Oda Nobunaga for unknown reasons.

In 1556, He fought in the Battle of Ino against Oda Nobuyuki.

In 1567, he was helping Oda Nobunaga to overthrow the Saitō clan at the Siege of Inabayama Castle against Saitō Tatsuoki.

In late 1568, Yoshinari joined Shibata Katsuie, Hachiya Yoritaka, Hosokawa Fujitaka and Sakai Masahisa in attacking Iwanari Tomomichi at Shōryūji Castle.

In 1570, Yoshinari fought in the Battle of Anegawa against the Asakura clan and the Azai clan.

Death
In 1570, Yoshinari died fighting in the Battle of Shimosakamoto at Usayama Castle against the Azai clan and the Asakura clan near Ōtsu in the aftermath of the Battle of Anegawa. 

Yoshinari was the father of the Oda's samurai Mori Nagayoshi and Mori Ranmaru. After Yoshinari died, Mori Nagayoshi took over the leadership of the clan, but he later died in the Battle of Nagakute in 1584.

Family
Sons:
 Mori Nagayoshi (1558-1584)
 Mori Ranmaru (1565-1582)
 Mori Bōmaru (1566–1582)
 Mori Rikimaru (1567–1582)
 Mori Tadamasa (d.1634)

References

Further reading

Samurai
1523 births
1570 deaths
Japanese warriors killed in battle
Deified Japanese people